Molly Chance is an American television producer and former actress. Molly's producing credits include the world's most popular and longest-running entertainment news program, Entertainment Tonight, as well as its spin-off, ET on MTV. Her acting credits include appearances on cult television show, Charmed, and popular 1980s sitcom, Punky Brewster.

Filmography

Talent Executive 
That Morning Show on E!

Producer 
Last Call with Carson Daly (talent)New Year's Eve with Carson Daly (talent)
Last Comic Standing (talent)
Entertainment Tonight
The Insider
ET on MTV

Actress 
Unsolved Mysteries (2002), as Christy
Charmed ("Ex Libris" 2000), as Young Lillian
Pajama Party (2000), as Party Girl (recurring)
Designing Women (1987), as Becky
General Hospital (1986), as Girl #1
Punky Brewster (1985), as Molly (recurring)

References 

Year of birth missing (living people)
Living people
American television actresses
American television producers
American women television producers
Place of birth missing (living people)
20th-century American actresses
21st-century American women